West River is an unincorporated community in Anne Arundel County, Maryland, United States.

Notable person
Joseph Galloway, First Continental Congressman
Gerri Whittington, First African-American secretary in the White House

References

Unincorporated communities in Anne Arundel County, Maryland
Unincorporated communities in Maryland